Sam C. Barrett is a retired United States Air Force lieutenant general who last served as the Director of Logistics of the Joint Staff. He previously served as commander of the Eighteenth Air Force. Prior to his current position, he was the director of operations, strategic deterrence and nuclear integration of the Air Force Materiel Command.

The United States Senate confirmed his promotion to lieutenant general and nomination to become the Director for Logistics of the Joint Staff, replacing Lieutenant General Giovanni K. Tuck whom he also succeeded as Eighteenth Air Force commander.

Effective dates of promotions

References

Living people
Place of birth missing (living people)
Recipients of the Air Force Distinguished Service Medal
Recipients of the Defense Superior Service Medal
Recipients of the Legion of Merit
United States Air Force generals
United States Air Force personnel of the Gulf War
Year of birth missing (living people)